YTY or yty may refer to:

 YTY, the IATA code for Yangzhou Taizhou International Airport, Jiangsu Province, China
 yty, the ISO 639-3 code for Yatay language, Queensland, Australia